The World's Billionaires is an annual ranking by documented net worth of the wealthiest billionaires in the world, compiled and published in March annually by the American business magazine Forbes. The list was first published in March 1987. The total net worth of each individual on the list is estimated and is cited in United States dollars, based on their documented assets and accounting for debt and other factors. Royalty and dictators whose wealth comes from their positions are excluded from these lists. This ranking is an index of the wealthiest documented individuals, excluding any ranking of those with wealth that is not able to be completely ascertained.

In 2018, Amazon founder Jeff Bezos was ranked at the top for the first time and became the first centibillionaire included in the ranking, surpassing Microsoft founder Bill Gates, who had topped the list 18 of the previous 24 years. In 2022, after topping the list for four years, Bezos was surpassed by Elon Musk.

Methodology
Each year, Forbes employs a team of over 50 reporters from a variety of countries to track the activity of the world's wealthiest individuals and sometimes groups or families – who share wealth. Preliminary surveys are sent to those who may qualify for the list. According to Forbes, they received three types of responses – some people try to inflate their wealth, others cooperate but leave out details, and some refuse to answer any questions. Business deals are then scrutinized and estimates of valuable assets – land, homes, vehicles, artwork, etc. – are made. Interviews are conducted to vet the figures and improve the estimate of an individual's holdings. Finally, positions in a publicly traded stock are priced to market on a date roughly a month before publication. Privately held companies are priced by the prevailing price-to-sales or price-to-earnings ratios. Known debt is subtracted from assets to get a final estimate of an individual's estimated worth in United States dollars. Since stock prices fluctuate rapidly, an individual's true wealth and ranking at the time of publication may vary from their situation when the list was compiled.

When a living individual has dispersed his or her wealth to immediate family members it is included under a single listing (as a single "family fortune") provided that individual (the grantor) is still living. However, if a deceased Billionaire’s fortune has been dispersed, it will not appear as a single listing, and each recipient will only appear if his or her own total net worth is over a $Billion (his net worth will not be combined with family members') Royal families and dictators that have their wealth contingent on a position are always excluded from these lists.

Annual rankings

The rankings are published annually in March, so the net worths listed are snapshots taken at that time. These lists only show the top 10 wealthiest billionaires for each year.

Legend

2022

In the 36th annual Forbes list of the world's billionaires, the list included 2,668 billionaires with a total net wealth of $12.7 trillion, down 97 members from 2021.

2021
In the 35th annual Forbes list of the world's billionaires, the list included 2,755 billionaires with a total net wealth of $13.1 trillion, up 660 members from 2020; 86% of these billionaires had more wealth than they possessed last year.

2020
In the 34th annual Forbes list of the world's billionaires, the list included 2,095 billionaires with a total net wealth of $8 trillion, down 58 members and $700 billion from 2019; 51% of these billionaires had less wealth than they possessed last year. The list was finalized as of 18 March, thus was already partially influenced by the COVID-19 pandemic.

2019
In the 33rd annual Forbes list of the world's billionaires, the list included 2,153 billionaires with a total net wealth of $8.7 trillion, down 55 members and $400 billion from 2018.  The U.S. continued to have the most billionaires in the world, with a record of 609, while China dropped to 324 (when not including Hong Kong, Macau and Taiwan).

2018
In the 32nd annual Forbes list of the world's billionaires, the aggregate wealth of the top 20 richest people on Earth amounted to about 13 percent of all billionaires' fortunes combined. A record of 2,208 billionaires were in the ranking and the total wealth was $9.1 trillion, up 18% since 2017. For the first time, Jeff Bezos was listed as the top billionaire due to Amazon's rising stock price that resulted in one person's biggest one-year gain in wealth ($35 billion) since Forbes started tracking in 1987. The U.S. had the most billionaires in the world, with 585, while China was catching up with 476 when including Hong Kong, Macau and Taiwan; it had 372 when excluding those three places. Forbes excluded Al-Walid bin Talal and all other Saudi billionaires due to the absence of accurate wealth estimations as a result of the 2017–19 Saudi Arabian purge.

2017
On the 30th anniversary of the Forbes list of the world's billionaires, for the fourth year in a row, Bill Gates was named the richest man in the world. In 2017, there was a record of 2,043 people on the list, which is the first time over 2,000 people were listed. This included 195 newcomers of whom 76 were from China and 25 from the U.S.; there were 56 people under 40 and it had a record of 227 women. The number of billionaires increased 13% to 2,043 from 1,810 in 2016; this was the biggest change in over 30 years of tracking billionaires globally. This was the first time after 12 years that Carlos Slim was not within the top five. The U.S. had the most billionaires in the world, with a record of 565. China had 319 (not including Hong Kong, Taiwan or Macau), Germany had 114, and India had the fourth most with 101; India reached over 100 billionaires for its first time.

2016
For the third year in a row, Bill Gates was named the richest man in the world by Forbes 2016 list of the world's billionaires. This is the 17th time that the founder of Microsoft had claimed the top spot. Amancio Ortega rose from last year's position of number four to second. Warren Buffett of Berkshire Hathaway came in third for the second consecutive time, while Mexican telecommunication mogul Carlos Slim slipped  from last year's second position to fourth. Jeff Bezos of Amazon, Mark Zuckerberg of Facebook and Michael Bloomberg of Bloomberg L.P., appeared for the first time on the Forbes top 10 billionaires list, coming at fifth, sixth and eighth positions, respectively. Zuckerberg became the youngest top 10 billionaire this year at the age of 31. Larry Ellison, Charles Koch and David Koch also slipped from their previous year's positions, with Ellison dropping to seventh from fifth, and the Kochs falling to ninth position from sixth.

2015

In the 29th annual Forbes list of global billionaires, a record 1,826 billionaires were named with an aggregated net worth of $7.1 trillion compared to $6.4 trillion in the previous year. 46 of the billionaires in this list were under the age of 40. A record number of 290 people joined the list for the first time, of whom 25 percent hailed from China, which produced a world-leading 71 newcomers. The United States came in second, with 57; followed by India, with 28; and Germany, with 23. The United States had the largest number of billionaires with 526. Russia went down to 88 from 111 in 2014. Russia was placed behind China, Germany and India by the number of billionaires. Self-made billionaires made up the largest number of people on the list with 1,191 positions (over 65 percent), while just 230 (under 13 percent) had wealth through inheritance. The number of billionaires who inherited a portion but were still working to increase their fortunes is 405.

Bill Gates was named the richest man in the world by Forbes' annual list of the world's billionaires. This was the 16th time that the founder of Microsoft claimed the top spot. Carlos Slim came in second for the second consecutive time. Warren Buffett of Berkshire Hathaway placed third, while Amancio Ortega of Spain, slipped down a position from the previous year to number four. Larry Ellison, the founder of Oracle, rounded off the top five. Christy Walton was the highest-ranking female at number eight. America's Evan Spiegel, co-founder of photo messaging app Snapchat, became the youngest billionaire this year at age 24. At age 99, David Rockefeller maintained his position as the oldest billionaire included in the list. Mark Zuckerberg, the founder of Facebook, rose to number 16 with $33.4 billion. Iceland had a billionaire, Thor Bjorgolfsson, in the list after a gap of five years. Guatemala had a billionaire, Mario Lopez Estrada, for the first time in its history.

2014

Gates added $9 billion to his fortune since 2013 and topped the Forbes 2014 billionaire list. He had topped the list in 15 of the previous 20 years, but his previous number one ranking was in 2009. Mexican telecommunication mogul Carlos Slim came in second place after being number one the previous four years. Zara founder Amancio Ortega placed third for the second consecutive year. American investor Warren Buffett was in the top five for the 20th consecutive year, placing fourth. America's Christy Walton was the highest ranking woman, placing ninth overall. Aliko Dangote of Nigeria became the first African to enter the top 25, with an estimated net worth of $25 billion.

A total of 1,645 people made the 2014 billionaire list, representing a combined wealth of $6.4 trillion. Of those, a record 268 were newcomers, surpassing 2008's 226 newcomers. 100 people listed in 2013 failed to make the list. The number of women on the list rose to a record 172 in 2014. Approximately 66 percent of the list were self-made, 13 percent achieved their wealth through inheritance alone, and 21 percent through a mixture of the two.

The United States had 492 billionaires on the list, the most of any country. It also had the most newcomers with 50, and women with 54. China had the second most billionaires with 152, while Russia was third with 111. Algeria, Lithuania, Tanzania, and Uganda were all represented on the list for the first time. Turkey saw the most people drop off the list, 19, due to a period of high inflation in the country.

2013

Carlos Slim topped the 2013 billionaire list, marking his fourth consecutive year at the top. Gates remained in second, while Amancio Ortega moved up to third. Ortega's gain of $19.5 billion was the largest of anyone on the list. Warren Buffett failed to make the top three for the first time since 2000, placing fourth. Diesel founder Renzo Rosso was among the top newcomers, debuting with an estimate net worth of $3 billion.

A global rise in asset prices led Forbes editor Randall Lane to declare "It [was] a very good year to be a billionaire". However, it was not a good year to be Eike Batista, who fell from seventh to 100th, suffering the largest net loss of anyone on the list. Overall, net gainers outnumbered net losers by 4:1.

A record total of 1,426 people made the 2013 list, representing $5.4 trillion of assets. Of those, 442 billionaires hailed from the United States. The Asian-Pacific region had 386 billionaires and Europe 366. The list also featured a record number of newcomers, 210, representing 42 countries. 60 people from the 2012 list fell below a billion dollars of assets in 2013, and eight others from the 2012 list died. The Asia-Pacific region had the most drop-offs, with 29, followed by the United States with 16. The 2013 list featured 138 women, of which 50 came from the United States. A majority of the list (961 individuals, 67 percent) were entirely self-made; 184 (13 percent) inherited their wealth, and 281 (20 percent) achieved their fortune through a combination of inheritance and business acumen. Vietnam's Phạm Nhật Vượng was the first person from that country to be included in this list.

2012

Carlos Slim topped the 2012 list, marking this third consecutive year at the top. Gates placed second but narrowed the gap from 2011 as Slim's fortune fell $5 billion while Gates' rose $5 billion. Warren Buffett remained in third place. Bernard Arnault of France was the top-ranking European on the list, placing fourth. Ricardo Salinas Pliego was the greatest gainer in terms of dollars, adding $9.2 billion to his fortune and moving up to number 37 overall. Making her debut on the list at age 27, Spanx founder Sara Blakely became the youngest self-made female billionaire ever. Colombia's Alejandro Santo Domingo was the highest-ranked newcomer, inheriting a $9.5 billion stake in Santo Domingo Group from his father. India's Lakshmi Mittal was the largest loser as his fortune dropped from $31.1 billion to $20.7 billion as the price of steelmaker ArcelorMittal fell sharply. As a result, he failed to make the top 10 for the first time since 2004 and lost his title of richest Asian to Hong Kong's Li Ka-shing.

A record total of 1,226 people made the 2012 list, representing 58 countries. Of those, 126 were newcomers to the list and 104 were women. The United States had the greatest number of billionaires with 425. Russia had 96 people on the list, while China had 95. Georgia, Morocco, and Peru were newly represented on the list. Falling stock prices in Asia contributed to 117 former billionaires falling from the list worldwide. Twelve others listed in 2011 died. Overall, net gainers (460) barely outnumbered net losers (441).

To coincide with the release of the 2012 list, Forbes announced a then-new "Billionaire Real-Time Ticker" updating the wealth of the world's top 50 billionaires in real time.

2011

In the 25th annual Forbes list of global billionaires, Slim added $20.5 billion to his fortune, the most of anyone, and retained his number one ranking with a total fortune of $74 billion. Gates remained in second place with $56 billion, while Warren Buffett was third with $50 billion. The top 10 had a combined wealth of $406 billion, up from $342 billion in 2010. According to Forbes editor Kerry Dolan, "media and technology billionaires definitely benefited from a stronger stock market and a growing enthusiasm for all things social" since the 2010 list. However, Nigerian commodity mogul Aliko Dangote was the greatest gainer on a percentage basis as his fortune increased 557 percent to $13.5 billion. Mark Zuckerberg was one of seven Facebook-related billionaires on the list, as he added $9.5 billion to his net worth to move up to 52nd. Facebook co-founder Dustin Moskovitz was the youngest person on the list. Aged 26, eight days younger than Zuckerberg, he debuted at number 420 with an estimated fortune of $2.7 billion. IKEA founder Ingvar Kamprad was the largest loser as he saw his fortune plummet from $23 billion to $6 billion, dropping him from 11th to 162nd overall.

A record 1,210 billionaires made the 2011 list, representing a combined wealth of $4.5 trillion, up from $3.6 trillion the previous year. One third of the world's billionaires, 413, came from the United States. China had the second most billionaires with 115, while Russia was third with 101. Asia moved up to 332 billionaires, passing Europe as a region for the first time since the 1990s. The 2011 list included 214 newcomers and the average net worth of those on it increased to $3.7 billion.

2010

Slim narrowly eclipsed Gates to top the billionaire list for the first time. Slim saw his estimated worth surge $18.5 billion to $53.5 billion as shares of America Movil rose 35 percent. Gates' estimated wealth rose $13 billion to $53 billion, placing him second. Warren Buffett was third with $47 billion. Christy Walton was the highest-ranking woman, placing 12th overall, with an inherited fortune of $22.5 billion. At age 25, Mark Zuckerberg continued to be the world's youngest self-made billionaire. American Isaac Perlmutter was among the newcomers with an estimated fortune of $4 billion largely acquired in his sale of Marvel Entertainment to Disney.

A total of 1,011 people made the 2010 list. The United States accounted for 403 billionaires, followed by China with 89 and Russia with 62. It was the first time China, while including Hong Kong, placed second. A total of 55 countries were represented on the 2010 list, including Finland and Pakistan which claimed their first billionaires. Eighty-nine women made the list, but only 14 of them were self-made. The combined net worth of the list was $3.6 trillion, up 50 percent from 2009's $2.4 trillion, while the average net worth was $3.5 billion.

The 2010 list featured 164 re-entries and 97 true newcomers. Asia accounted for more than 100 of the new entrants. Overall, just 12 percent of the list lost wealth since 2009, and 30 people fell off the list. 13 others died. Of the 89 women, 12 were newcomers in 2010. Steve Forbes said the growing number of billionaires was a clear sign that the world's economy was recovering from 2009's global financial crisis.

In June 2010, Gates and Buffett announced the Giving Pledge, a promise to give the majority of their wealth to philanthropic causes. As of 2017, the pledge had 158 signatories, but some of the signatories have since died. Most of the signers of the pledge are billionaires, and their pledges total over $365 billion.

2009
In the wake of the Financial crisis of 2007–2008, the world's billionaires lost $2 trillion in net worth and the list became 30% smaller than the previous year's list.

2008
Facebook founder Mark Zuckerberg, four years after starting the company, joined the list at 23 to become the youngest self-made billionaire.

2007
Forbes recorded a then record of 946 billionaires. There were 178 newcomers, as well as the first billionaires from Cyprus, Oman, Romania and Serbia. Over 66% of the previous year's billionaires became richer. The billionaires' net worth increased in 2007 by $900 billion to $3.5 trillion.

2006
Free cash used by consumers from home equity extraction, known as the real estate bubble created a total of nearly $5 trillion in 2005, contributing to economic growth worldwide.

2005
The net worth of 2005's 691 billionaires was $2.2 trillion. More than half of them had self-made fortunes.

2004
The founders of Google, Sergey Brin and Larry Page, became billionaires at age 30.

* Each hold an essentially equal share in Walmart.

2003
Oprah Winfrey became the first female African-American billionaire.

* Each hold an essentially equal share in Walmart.

2002
As a result of the market crash caused by the Dot-com bubble, 83 billionaires dropped off the list from the previous year.

* Each hold an essentially equal share in Walmart.

2001
In 2001, BET founder Robert L. Johnson became the first ever African-American billionaire.

* Each hold an essentially equal share in Wal-Mart. Had he been alive in 2001, Sam Walton would have been the world's wealthiest person.

2000
Gates became the first American to take the top spot of the world's billionaires in 1995 with a net worth of $12.5 billion, and he remained there during the dot-com bubble's height in 1999 when his fortune peaked at $90 billion. After the dot-com bubble started to collapse in 2000, his wealth dropped to $60 billion, although he remained at the top of the list.

1999

1998

1997

1996

1995

1994

1993

1992

1991

1990

1989

1988

1987

Statistics
The dot-com bubble created the most paper wealth for some billionaires. However, once the dotcom bubble burst the new rich saw their fortunes disappear. Billionaires' fortunes were hit even harder by the global financial crisis; 2009 was the first time in five years that the world had a net loss in the number of billionaires. The strong performance of the financial markets and global economic recovery have erased financial assets losses. Most of the richest people in the world saw their fortunes soar in the early 2010s.

See also

 Bloomberg Billionaires Index
 List of centibillionaires
 List of cities by number of billionaires
 List of countries by number of billionaires
 List of wealthiest animals
 List of wealthiest families
 List of wealthiest historical figures
 List of wealthiest religious organizations

References

Specific

General
 2000–2010 Top 10s: 
 2011 Top 10: 
 2012 Top 10: 
 2013 Top 10: 
 2014 Top 10: 
 2015 Top 10:

External links
 Forbes: "The World's Billionaires"
 Forbes: Real-Time Billionaires

Billionaires
Forbes lists
Lists of people by magazine appearance